Miroslav Jočić (born 20 June 1962) is a Serbian judoka. He competed in the men's lightweight event at the 1992 Summer Olympics.

References

External links
 

1962 births
Living people
Serbian male judoka
Olympic judoka as Independent Olympic Participants
Judoka at the 1992 Summer Olympics
Place of birth missing (living people)